The Franco-German Youth Office (FGYO; , OFAJ; , DFJW) is an organisation to subsidize programs for children, adolescents and young adults. Its main goal is to intensify the Franco-German relationships through cultural exchange on the level of students.

History 
The Youth Office was one of the first institutions created on the basis of the Élysée Treaty that was signed in 1963 in Paris.

The FGYO was originally headquartered in Rhöndorf near Bonn, then the West German capital. In December 2000, the least employees moved out from there. It is now headquartered in Paris, with its main German office in Berlin and a branch office, which opened in 2014, in Saarbrücken.

Since 1963 the organisation has financed projects for 9.5 million young Germans and French through participation in 382.000 exchange programs. In 2021 it has organised 3310 events with about 68,000 participants.

The funding has been increased along with decisions made on the annual Franco-German Ministerial Council. It is considered to be a cornerstone in ending the centuries of French–German enmity.

See also 
 Franco-German high schools
 Franco-German University / Erasmus Programme
 Interrail Youth Pass
 Confederation of European Journeymen Associations

References

External links 
 Website in English: 

France–Germany relations
Youth organizations established in 1963
Youth organizations based in France
Youth organisations based in Germany